Socorro (Portuguese for "Help") is a district in the subprefecture of Capela do Socorro, in southern São Paulo, Brazil. Between the Guarapiranga and Billings Reservoirs, lies the Autódromo José Carlos Pace.

Education

Colégio Humboldt São Paulo, a German international school, is located in Interlagos in Socorro.

Neighborhoods 

 Interlagos
 Jardim Bessa
 Vila Califórnia
 Capela do Socorro
 Jardim Cristina
 Vila Franca
 Vila Friburgo
 Jardim Guarapiranga
 Parque Interlagos
 Jardim Ipanema
 Jardim do Lago
 Vila Lisboa
 Jardim Mara
 Jardim Marabá
 Jardim Nova Guarapiranga
 Jardim Paquetá
 Parque Rony
 Jardim Santa Helena
 Jardim São Jorge
 Jardim São José de Guarapiranga
 Socorro
 Jardim Socorro
 Vila Socorro
 Jardim Suzana
 Jardim Tereza
 Jardim Três Marias
 Veleiros
 Jardim Veneza

See also
  Socorro (CPTM) Train Station
 Roman Catholic Diocese of Santo Amaro
 Line 9 (CPTM)

References

External links 
 Subprefecture Capela do Socorro
 Interlagos News
 Gazette of Interlagos
 Roman Catholic Diocese of Santo Amaro

Districts of São Paulo